Lambertocyon is a genus of ungulates from western North America. Three species are known, making their last appearance in the Late Paleocene Clarkforkian stage.

References

Condylarths
Fossil taxa described in 1979
Paleocene mammals
Paleogene mammals of North America
Prehistoric placental genera